Game gun or variation may refer to:

 Hunting gun, a gun used to hunt game
 Light gun, a video game accessory
 Gamegun (GAMEGUN), a light gun for 3DO
 Game controllers shaped like a gun
 Toy gun
 Water gun
 Pop gun
 Cap gun
 Airsoft gun, guns used for recreational play, such as in tagball matches, paintball games, etc.
 Laser tag guns, used to play games of laser tag

See also
 Gun (video game), a video game named "Gun"
 Gun fu, a fictional martial art that uses guns as its focal weapon, used in fictional games of guns
 Gungame (disambiguation)
 Gun (disambiguation)
 Game (disambiguation)